Streptomyces bobili is a bacterium species from the genus of Streptomyces which has been isolated from garden soil. Streptomyces bobili produces aclacinomycin A, aclacinomycin B, aclacinomycin M, aclacinomycin S, aclacinomycin Y, cinerubin A, cinerubin B, sulfurmycin A, sulfurmycin B, sulfurmycin C, sulfurmycin D, sulfurmycin F, ferrimycin A1 and ferrimycin A2.

See also 
 List of Streptomyces species

References

Further reading

External links
Type strain of Streptomyces bobili at BacDive -  the Bacterial Diversity Metadatabase

bobili
Bacteria described in 1948